The Dallas–Fort Worth Film Critics Association Award for Best Actor is an award presented by the Dallas–Fort Worth Film Critics Association. It is given in honor of an actor who has delivered an outstanding performance in a leading role.

Winners and nominees

1990s
1990: Jeremy Irons as Claus von Bülow – Reversal of Fortune
 Gérard Depardieu as Cyrano de Bergerac – Cyrano de Bergerac
 Richard Harris as Bull McCabe – The Field

1991: Anthony Hopkins as Dr. Hannibal Lecter – The Silence of the Lambs

1992: Denzel Washington as Malcolm X – Malcolm X

1993: Anthony Hopkins as Mr. James Stevens – The Remains of the Day

1994: Tom Hanks as Forrest Gump – Forrest Gump

1995: Nicolas Cage as Ben Sanderson – Leaving Las Vegas

1996: Geoffrey Rush as David Helfgott – Shine

1997: Peter Fonda as Ulysses "Ulee" Jackson – Ulee's Gold

1998: Jim Carrey as Truman Burbank – The Truman Show

1999: Kevin Spacey as Lester Burnham – American Beauty

2000s
2000: Russell Crowe as Maximus Decimus Meridius – Gladiator
 Sean Connery as William Forrester – Finding Forrester
 Michael Douglas as Professor Grady Tripp – Wonder Boys
 Tom Hanks as Chuck Noland – Cast Away
 Geoffrey Rush as Marquis de Sade – Quills

2001: Russell Crowe as John Nash – A Beautiful Mind
 Will Smith as Muhammad Ali – Ali
 Billy Bob Thornton as Ed Crane – The Man Who Wasn't There
 Denzel Washington as Detective Sergeant Alonzo Harris – Training Day
 Tom Wilkinson as Matt Fowler – In the Bedroom

2002: Jack Nicholson as Warren Schmidt – About Schmidt
 Adrien Brody as Władysław Szpilman – The Pianist
 Nicolas Cage as Charlie Kaufman and Donald Kaufman – Adaptation.
 Daniel Day-Lewis as Bill "The Butcher" Cutting – Gangs of New York
 Robin Williams as Seymour "Sy" Parrish – One Hour Photo

2003: Sean Penn as Jimmy Markum – Mystic River
 Johnny Depp as Captain Jack Sparrow – Pirates of the Caribbean: The Curse of the Black Pearl
 Paul Giamatti as Harvey Pekar – American Splendor
 Ben Kingsley as Colonel Massoud Amir Behrani – House of Sand and Fog
 Bill Murray as Bob Harris – Lost in Translation

2004: Paul Giamatti as Miles Raymond – Sideways
 Don Cheadle as Paul Rusesabagina – Hotel Rwanda
 Johnny Depp as J. M. Barrie – Finding Neverland
 Leonardo DiCaprio as Howard Hughes – The Aviator
 Jamie Foxx as Ray Charles – Ray

2005: Philip Seymour Hoffman as Truman Capote – Capote
 Russell Crowe as James J. Braddock – Cinderella Man
 Heath Ledger as Ennis Del Mar – Brokeback Mountain
 Joaquin Phoenix as Johnny Cash – Walk the Line
 David Strathairn as Edward R. Murrow – Good Night, and Good Luck.

2006: Forest Whitaker as Idi Amin – The Last King of Scotland
 Leonardo DiCaprio as Danny Archer – Blood Diamond
 Leonardo DiCaprio as William "Billy" Costigan Jr. – The Departed
 Ryan Gosling as Dan Dunne – Half Nelson
 Peter O'Toole as Maurice Russell – Venus

2007: Daniel Day-Lewis as Daniel Plainview – There Will Be Blood
 George Clooney as Michael Clayton – Michael Clayton
 Emile Hirsch as Chris McCandless – Into the Wild
 Tommy Lee Jones as Hank Deerfield – In the Valley of Elah
 Frank Langella as Leonard Schiller – Starting Out in the Evening

2008: Sean Penn as Harvey Milk – Milk
 Richard Jenkins as Walter Vale – The Visitor
 Frank Langella as Richard Nixon – Frost/Nixon
 Brad Pitt as Benjamin Button – The Curious Case of Benjamin Button
 Mickey Rourke as Robin Ramzinski / Randy "The Ram" Robinson – The Wrestler

2009: George Clooney as Ryan Bingham – Up in the Air
 Jeff Bridges as Otis "Bad" Blake – Crazy Heart
 Colin Firth as George Falconer – A Single Man
 Morgan Freeman as Nelson Mandela – Invictus
 Jeremy Renner as Staff Sergeant William James – The Hurt Locker

2010s
2010: James Franco as Aron Ralston – 127 Hours
 Michael Douglas as Ben Kalmen – Solitary Man
 Robert Duvall as Felix Bush – Get Low
 Jesse Eisenberg as Mark Zuckerberg – The Social Network
 Colin Firth as King George VI – The King's Speech

2011: George Clooney as Matt King – The Descendants
 Jean Dujardin as George Valentin – The Artist
 Michael Fassbender as Brandon Sullivan – Shame
 Brad Pitt as Billy Beane – Moneyball
 Michael Shannon as Curtis LaForche – Take Shelter

2012: Daniel Day-Lewis as Abraham Lincoln – Lincoln
 John Hawkes as Mark O'Brien – The Sessions
 Hugh Jackman as Jean Valjean – Les Misérables
 Joaquin Phoenix as Freddie Quell – The Master
 Denzel Washington as Captain William "Whip" Whitaker Sr. – Flight

2013: Matthew McConaughey as Ron Woodroof – Dallas Buyers Club
 Bruce Dern as Woody Grant – Nebraska
 Leonardo DiCaprio as Jordan Belfort – The Wolf of Wall Street
 Chiwetel Ejiofor as Solomon Northup – 12 Years a Slave
 Tom Hanks as Captain Richard Phillips – Captain Phillips

2014: Michael Keaton as Riggan Thomson – Birdman or (The Unexpected Virtue of Ignorance)
 Benedict Cumberbatch as Alan Turing – The Imitation Game
 Jake Gyllenhaal as Louis "Lou" Bloom – Nightcrawler
 Eddie Redmayne as Stephen Hawking – The Theory of Everything
 Timothy Spall as J. M. W. Turner – Mr. Turner

2015: Leonardo DiCaprio as Hugh Glass – The Revenant
 Matt Damon as Mark Watney – The Martian
 Johnny Depp as James "Whitey" Bulger – Black Mass
 Michael Fassbender as Steve Jobs – Steve Jobs
 Eddie Redmayne as Einar Wegener / Lili Elbe – The Danish Girl

2016: Casey Affleck as Lee Chandler – Manchester by the Sea
 Joel Edgerton as Richard Loving – Loving
 Ryan Gosling as Sebastian Wilder – La La Land
 Tom Hanks as Chesley "Sully" Sullenberger – Sully
 Denzel Washington as Troy Maxson – Fences

2017: Gary Oldman as Winston Churchill – Darkest Hour
 Timothée Chalamet as Elio Perlman – Call Me by Your Name
 Daniel Day-Lewis as Reynolds Woodcock – Phantom Thread
 James Franco as Tommy Wiseau – The Disaster Artist
 Tom Hanks as Ben Bradlee – The Post

2018: Christian Bale as Dick Cheney – Vice
 Bradley Cooper as Jackson Maine – A Star Is Born
 Ethan Hawke as Reverend Ernst Toller – First Reformed
 Rami Malek as Freddie Mercury – Bohemian Rhapsody
 Viggo Mortensen as Frank "Tony Lip" Vallelonga – Green Book

2019: Adam Driver as Charlie Barber – Marriage Story
 Antonio Banderas as Salvador Mallo – Pain and Glory
 Robert De Niro as Frank Sheeran – The Irishman
 Leonardo DiCaprio as Rick Dalton – Once Upon a Time in Hollywood
 Joaquin Phoenix as Arthur Fleck / Joker – Joker

2020s
2020: Chadwick Boseman as Levee Green – Ma Rainey's Black Bottom
 Riz Ahmed as Ruben Stone – Sound of Metal
 Anthony Hopkins as Anthony – The Father
 Delroy Lindo as Paul – Da 5 Bloods
 Gary Oldman as Herman J. Mankiewicz – Mank

2021: Benedict Cumberbatch as Phil Burbank – The Power of the Dog
 Peter Dinklage as Cyrano de Bergerac – Cyrano
 Andrew Garfield as Jonathan Larson – tick, tick... BOOM!
 Will Smith as Richard Williams – King Richard
 Denzel Washington as Lord Macbeth – The Tragedy of Macbeth

2022: Colin Farrell as Pádraic Súilleabháin – The Banshees of Inisherin
 Austin Butler as Elvis Presley – Elvis
 Tom Cruise as Captain Pete "Maverick" Mitchell – Top Gun: Maverick
 Brendan Fraser as Charlie – The Whale
 Bill Nighy as Mr. Williams – Living

References

External links
 Official website

Actor
Film awards for lead actor